The Opus is an American hip hop record production duo from Chicago, Illinois. It consists of The Isle of Weight and Mr. Echoes. AllMusic described them as "two of the most brilliant beatmakers working in hip-hop circa 2003."

The Isle of Weight (born Aaron Smith) and Mr. Echoes (born Kevin Johnson) first met while attending Proviso East High School together. In 1994, the duo started making music together. The duo handled the production work on Rubberoom's 1999 album Architechnology.

Members
 The Isle of Weight (born Aaron Smith) - production
 Mr. Echoes (born Kevin Johnson) - production

Discography

Studio albums
 First Contact 001 (2002)
 Breathing Lessons (2003)
 Praying Mantis-Plus (2010)

Compilation albums
 Blending Density (2010)
 The Opus of the Opus Vol. One (2010)
 The Opus of the Opus Vol. Two (2010)

EPs
 0.0.0. (2002)
 Movement One (2002)
 Movement Two (2002)
 Movement Three (2002)
 Movement Four (2003)
 Movement Five (2004)
 Earthwalkers EP (2004)
 Praying Mantis EP (2010)
 The Save Me Gallery (2010)
 March of the Termites (2012)
 Man Down (2017)

Singles
 "Live" (2002)
 "Madhouse" (2004)
 "Up & Away" (2011)
 "International" (2011)
 "A Stainless Steel Xmas" (2011)

Productions
 Rubberoom - Gothic Architecture (1995)
 Rubberoom - Architechnology (1999)
 Thawfor - Where Thawght Is Worshiped (2001)
 DJ Krush - "Trihedron" from The Message at the Depth (2002)
 Sonic Sum - "Films (The Opus Remix)" from Operazor EP (2003)
 Verbal Kent - "Alien Rock" from What Box (2004)
 Eliot Lipp - "Its Time to Leave (The Opus Remix)" from Brolabs (2011)

References

External links
 
 

American musical duos
Midwest hip hop groups
Musical groups from Chicago
Record production duos